Periclimenes mahei is a species of saltwater shrimp in the family, Palaemonidae, and was first described in 1969 by Alexander James Bruce.

The egg-bearing holotype was collected at depth  of 1-2 fathoms in North West Bay, Mahé, in the Seychelles.

It is found in shallow subtidal waters on Acropora  and madrepore corals.
In Australia it is found in the Northern Territory, Western Australia and Queensland. It is also found in waters off  Zanzibar, the Seychelles, the Comoro Islands, Tuomoto, and Amirante Islands.

References

External links
Periclimenes mahei occurrence data from GBIF.

Palaemonidae
Crustaceans described in 1969
Taxa named by Alexander James Bruce